The Great Arrival is a 1966 instrumental album by Sérgio Mendes.

Track listing
"The Great Arrival (Chegança)" (Edu Lobo, Oduvaldo Vianna Filho) 2:19
"Monday, Monday" (John Phillips) 2:32
"Carnaval" (Clare Fischer) 2:40
"Canção do Amanhecer" (Edu Lobo, Vinícius de Moraes) 2:48 	
"Here's That Rainy Day" (Jimmy Van Heusen, Johnny Burke) 2:22
"Borandá" (Edu Lobo) 2:41
"Nanã" (Moacir Santos, Mário Telles) 2:35
"Bonita" (Antônio Carlos Jobim) 3:24
"Morning" (Clare Fischer) 2:38
"Don't Go Breaking My Heart" (Burt Bacharach, Hal David) 2:34
"Tristeza de Amar" (Geraldo Vandré, Luiz Roberto) 3:18
"Girl Talk" (Neil Hefti, Bobby Troup) 2:24

Personnel
Clare Fischer – arranger, conductor (track 3, 6, 9 & 12)
Bob Florence – arranger, conductor  (track 1, 2, 7 & 10)
Richard Hazard – arranger, conductor  (track 4, 5, 8 & 11)
John Norman – recording engineer
Marvin Israel – album design
Otto Stupakoff – cover photo

References

1966 albums
Sérgio Mendes albums
Albums conducted by Bob Florence
Albums arranged by Bob Florence
Albums conducted by Richard Hazard
Albums arranged by Richard Hazard
Albums produced by Nesuhi Ertegun
Atlantic Records albums